Have You Heard...Dottie West is a studio album by American country music artist Dottie West. It was released in October 1971 on RCA Victor Records and was produced by Jerry Bradley. The album was West's eighteenth studio record released in her career and second record to be released in 1971. The album included ten tracks, two of which became singles. The first single, "Six Weeks Every Summer (Christmas Every Other Year)", became a minor hit on the country charts.

Background and content
Have You Heard...Dottie West was recorded in July 1971 at RCA Studio B, located in Nashville, Tennessee. The sessions were produced by Jerry Bradley. The project was West's fourth with Bradley serving as the producer. The album was a collection of ten tracks. Six of the album's songs were cover versions of hit singles by country and pop artists. Among the record's covers was Don Gibson's "Just one Time" (which had been recently revitalized by Connie Smith), "Me and Bobby McGee" by Roger Miller (which had recently been a pop hit for Janis Joplin) and "No Love at All" by Lynn Anderson. Original tracks included "Six Weeks Every Summer (Christmas Every Other Year)" and "Wish I Didn't Love You Anymore". Larry Gatlin composed two of the album's tracks as well. It was West who discovered Gatlin and was impressed by his songwriting. The Gatlin-penned tracks were his first to be included on an artist's album.

Release and reception
Have You Heard...Dottie West was released in October 1971 on RCA Victor Records, making it West's eighteenth studio album. It was issued as a vinyl LP, containing five songs on both sides of the record. The album was West's second in a row to not make the Billboard Top Country Albums chart. It also spawned two singles, which were both released in 1971. The first was "Six Weeks Every Summer (Christmas Every Other Year)", which was issued in August 1971. The single made an appearance on the Billboard Hot Country Singles chart, only peaking at number 51 after eight weeks. The second single to be issued was "You're the Other Half of Me" in December 1971. The song failed to chart. The album received praise upon its release. Billboard gave the release a warm reception in December 1971, highlighting Bradley's production and West's vocal styling. "Miss West's uncomplicated vocal style is given a similar setting by producer Jerry Bradley and the result is an LP that has class written all over it," writers commented.

Track listing

Personnel
All credits are adapted from the liner notes of Have You Heard...Dottie West.

Musical personnel

 Byron Bach – cello
 Brenton Banks – violin
 George Binkley – violin
 Harold Bradley – guitar
 David Briggs – harpsichord, piano
 Martin Chantry – viola
 Albert Coleman – violin
 Pete Drake – steel guitar
 Ray Edenton – guitar
 Lillian Hunt – violin
 The Jordanaires – background vocals
 Martin Katahn – violin

 Sheldon Kurland – violin
 Grady Martin – guitar
 Charlie McCoy – harmonica, vibes
 Snuffy Miller – drums
 Bob Moore – bass
 Hargus "Pig" Robbins – piano
 Jerry Shook – guitar
 Gary Vanosdale – viola
 Bill West – steel guitar
 Dottie West – lead vocals
 Gary Williams – cello
 Chip Young – guitar

Technical personnel
 Jerry Bradley – producer
 Les Ladd – engineering
 Jimmy Moore – cover photo
 David Roys – recording technician
 Mike Shockley – recording technician 
 Roy Shockley – recording technician 
 Bill Vandevort – engineering
 Bergen White – arrangement, conducting

Release history

References

1971 albums
Albums produced by Jerry Bradley (music executive)
Dottie West albums
RCA Records albums